The Botswana Predator Conservation Trust (BPCT), formerly called the Botswana Wild Dog Research Project in 1989, expanded from addressing wild dog conservation to cover all the large carnivore species in Botswana.

Description
The Botswana Predator Conservation Trust is one of the longest running large predator research projects in Africa, and one of only a handful of its caliber worldwide. BPCT research on wild dogs has made it abundantly clear that the health and welfare of the entire predator population is a key indication of overall health of Botswana's ecosystems.

The Government of Botswana, also acknowledging that appropriate and necessary resource management cannot be undertaken in the absence of accurate information about its natural resources, has entrusted BPCT with the task of leading northern Botswana's conservation and research initiatives for all large carnivores and their associated habitats of the country.

Okavango Delta research
The Okavango Delta, where most of BPCT's research takes place, is a freshwater wetland of global importance. It is the largest Ramsar International Convention on Wetlands protected site on Earth, and was granted IUCNworld heritage status by the World Conservation Union (IUCN).

See also

References

External links
 

Dog organizations
Environmental organisations based in Botswana
Wildlife conservation organizations
Carnivorans of Africa
Nature conservation in Botswana
Mammals of Botswana
Environmental organizations established in 1989
1989 establishments in Botswana